Rishu, lit. "Day Book," is a genre of divinatory texts that circulated widely in China from the late Warring States Period to the Western Han dynasty. Rishu is also the name of one of the primary literatures for the schools of orthodox Shingon Buddhism of Japan. This term finds its first evident presence dated back to 217 BCE in China.

Historical Significance

China

In Mainland China, the Rishu "Day Book" is one of the divinatory books discovered in late Warring States period tomb libraries which has confirmed the Baopuzi description of Yubu as a series of three steps. It has great cultural significance in ancient and medieval China. It is an almanac or hemerology which is one of the Shuihudi Qin bamboo texts recovered in 1975 in Shuihudi, Hubei, from a tomb dated 217 BCE. Donald Harper (1999:843) believes that for describing texts like the Rishu , which determine lucky and unlucky days on sexagenary cycle numerology without reference to astrology, "hemerology" is a more accurate translation than "almanac" (typically meaning an annual publication for a single calendar year).

The Steps of Yu 
The Rishu has one occurrence of Yubu san , "'Steps of Yu, three times", and one of Yubu sanmian , "Steps of Yu, three exertions". This is consistent with the Baopuzi descriptions of Yubu in terms of sanbu "three steps" and jiuji , "nine footprints/traces," where each "step" was composed of three separate steps. Andersen (1989:17) notes that the term Sanbu jiuji was later used synonymously with Yubu.

Yu is closely associated with travel in the Rishu (Harper 1999:872). The section titled "Yu xuyu"  "Promptuary/Instant of Yu" begins by listing the stem and branch sexagenary cycle in five groups of twelve signs each, and gives, for the days in each group, a certain lucky time of day to safely begin a journey. This section concludes with a ritual to be performed before going out of the city gate.

Isabelle Robinet (1997:39) says this text lets us reconstruct the connection between "exorcistic practices intended to ward off harmful demons, and therapeutic practices intended to ensure good hygiene and good physical balance", in other words, "the evolution of exorcism toward medicine, a shift from conceiving sickness as caused by demons to seeing sickness as the result of an imbalance".

Japan 
In Japan, the term has more varied and widespread significance in different aspects of its culture. The most prominent of them are listed below:
 
Rishu-kyō (the Adhyardhaśatikā Prajñāpāramitā Sutra) is one of the primary literature for all the schools of orthodox Shingonshu. The others being the Mahavairocana Tantra, the Vajrasekhara Sutra, and the Susiddhikāra Sūtra (Soshitsuji-kyō 蘇悉地経). These are the four principle texts of Esoteric Buddhism. They are all Tantras, literally "treatise". These texts played a vital role in Tachikawa-ryu. But according to the author and Tachikawa-ryu historian, John Stevens as well as James Sanford, the most important text to the ryūha (流派) perhaps, was the Sutra of Secret Bliss (ca. 1100). This sutra contains the school's general teachings concerning sexuality and its role in reaching enlightenment. It was Rishu-kyō.

Contemporary world significance 
 
 The Japanese calendar designates some days of the year with special names to mark the change in the season. The 24 sekki are days that divide the solar year into twenty four equal sections.  is a collective term for the seasonal days other than the 24 sekki.  days are made from dividing the 24 sekki of a year further by three. Out of these special names, Shunbun, Risshū and Tōji are quite frequently used in everyday life in Japan. Of the 24 sekki, Risshū (立秋) is the 13th solar term which signifies the beginning of autumn season.

Places associated 
 
There are several places across East Asia associated with this term in different aspects.
 
 Renge-in Tanjō-ji (蓮華院誕生寺) is a Buddhist temple of the Shingon Risshu, situated in Tamana, Kumamoto Prefecture of Japan. It is the head temple of Shingon-Vinaya Buddhism in Kyūshū and a branch temple of Saidai-ji (西大寺) in Nara (奈良). It venerates Maha-Bodhisattva Kōen (皇円大菩薩, Kōen Daibosatsu) as its patron deity. At the temple, the 13th of each month is a festive day and the 3rd and the 23rd subsidiary festive days, and services are held on these days. A service comprises the reciting of Adhyardhaśatikā Prajñāpāramitā Sūtra (理趣経, Rishu-kyō) by the monks and various sutras designated for the lay devotees in Shingon Buddhism by the monks along with the devotees followed by a lecture by the abbot.

See also
Bugang, a Daoist ritual dance based upon the limping Yubu
Cantong qi
Paidushko horo, a Balkan "limping dance"
Yu the Great, Xia dynasty king and founder

References
Andersen, Poul (1989), "The Practice of Bugang", Cahiers d'Extrême-Asie 5:15-53.
Granet, Marcel (1925), "Remarques sur le Taoïsme Ancien", Asia Major 2:146–151.
Harper, Donald (1999), "Warring States Natural Philosophy and Occult Thought", in The Cambridge History of Ancient China, ed. by Michael Loewe and Edward L. Shaughnessy, Cambridge University Press, 813–884.
Robinet, Isabelle (1997), Taoism: Growth of a Religion, tr. by Phyllis Brooks, Stanford University Press.

Ancient China
Buddhism in China
Taoist texts
Taoist divination
Chinese books of divination